Llanbadarn Fynydd (meaning Church of Padarn in the mountain) is a village and community in Radnorshire, Powys, Wales, and is  from Cardiff and  from London.

The community includes the villages of Llanbadarn Fynydd, Llananno and Llaithddu. In 2011 the population of Llanbadarn Fynydd was 306 with 8.8% of them able to speak Welsh.

Castell y Blaidd Medieval Settlement lies nearby as well as Coventry Round Barrow and Moel Dod Round Barrow.

The New Inn is a former 17th-century coaching inn, now a family-run pub and restaurant.

It lies on the A483 road which runs from Swansea to Chester.

See also
List of localities in Wales by population

References

Communities in Powys
Villages in Powys